Purnendu Patri (sometimes Anglicised as Purnendu Pattrea) (2February 193119 March 1997) was an Indian poet, writer, editor, artist, illustrator, and film director. He was best known for his poems and stories, particularly for his poetry collection Kathopokathan in Bengali, and for his experimentation with book cover design. He also was a researcher of the history of Kolkata.

Career
Pattrea was admitted to Indian Art College in 1949. He started contributing his painting and writing to the film magazine "Chitrita", and the cultural magazine "Deepali", which were edited and co-edited respectively by his uncle Nikunjabihari Pattrea. His first collection of poems, Ek Mutho Rod ("a Handful of Sun"), was published in 1951.
In 1958, his first novel, Dnarer Moyna ("Caged  Myna"), won him the then prestigious award 'Manik Smriti Purashkar' by Ultarath Publication. He was the first art director of the Ananda Bazar Patrika group of publications, from 1971 to 1984/85.

Pattrea was the director and screenwriter for the 1972 film Strir Patra. This was awarded the Rajat Kamal (Silver Lotus) for Best Feature Film in Bengali, at the 20th National Film Awards. The film also received the Award for Best Direction at the Tashkent Film Festival. His other films included Swapnoniye, Malancha, Chhenra Tamsuk, Chhotobakulpurer jatri etc.

His first solo painting exhibition was held in British Council, Kolkata in 1982. He also had his other solo exhibitions held in Jehangir Art Gallery, Bombay and Cema Art Gallery, Kolkata. He started a research project on Bankim Chandra Chatterjee, 'Bankim Jug' (The Era of Bankim); unfortunately only the first of five planned volumes was published before his death.

Filmography
Strir Patra (1972)
Swapnoniye (1966)
Malancha
Chhera Tamsuk (1974)
Chhotobakulpurer Jatri

References

External links

1931 births
1997 deaths
20th-century Bengali poets
20th-century Indian dramatists and playwrights
20th-century Indian film directors
20th-century Indian poets
20th-century Indian male writers
Bengali film directors
Bengali male poets
Film directors from West Bengal
Indian male poets
People from Howrah district
Writers from West Bengal